Cinema Politica (CP) is a non-profit media arts organization based in Montreal with nearly 100 screening locations all over the world (as of September 2011). Each chapter ("local") screens independent political documentaries for free or by donation to audiences, with guest filmmakers and speakers often invited to participate. CP claims to be the "largest volunteer-run, community and campus-based documentary-screening network in the world."

Cinema Politica started in Montreal at Concordia University in 2003 as an incorporated non-profit network and organization with several chapters throughout Canada and abroad. Cinema Politica is funded through arts council grants, membership fees, distribution revenues and audience donations. 

Most CP locals are based on campuses in Canada and Europe, but the organization has locations off-campus (community locals) and in other parts of the world including Latin America and Africa.

Cinema Politica's Mandate 
Cinema Politica states that its mandate is to support "alternative, independent, and radical political film and video, and the artists who dare to devote time, passion and resources to telling stories from the margins. We program works that feature under-represented characters and tell stories which confront and challenge conventional fiction and documentary narratives."

Supporters 

CP is mainly funded by the Canada Council for the Arts, membership fees from locals, fundraising and donations from audience members. CP has partnerships with the following distributors: the National Film Board of Canada, Mongrel Media, Women Make Movies, les Films du 3 mars, Java Films, and others.

Cinema Politica awards

The Cinema Politica Audience Award 
Each year Cinema Politica nominates the 10 most-screened films in the network for the CP Audience Award. Audiences members across the network choose the winner.

Previous winners:
 2008: Roadsworth: Crossing the Line
 2009: American Radical: The Trials of Norman Finkelstein
 2010: Dreamland

The Alanis Obomsawin Award for Commitment to Community and Resistance 
This award is presented to a Canadian filmmaker who "has shown a commitment to community and resistance in documentary filmmaking." The award is named after the prolific National Film Board director Alanis Obomsawin. The first Alanis Award was given to John Greyson in March 2011.

Cinema Politica Board of Directors and Advisory Committee 
Cinema Politica is governed by a board of directors, and is aided in their work by the members of an advisory committee. Currently, they are made up of:

BOARD OF DIRECTORS
 Michael Lithgow // Writer; Video Artist; PhD candidate in Media Studies (Carleton)
 Inês Lopes // PhD, Education consultant; Founder of CP-UQAM 
 Liz Miller // Filmmaker (The Water Front); Assoc. Professor (Concordia)
 Thomas Waugh // Professor in the Mel Hoppenheim School of Cinema (Concordia)
 Ezra Winton // Director of Programming and Founder - Cinema Politica; Editor - Art Threat; PhD candidate in Media Studies (Carleton University)

ADVISORY COMMITTEE
 Tracey Deer
 Sean Farnel
 John Greyson
 Sylvia Hamilton
 Peter Wintonick
 b.h. Yael

References

External links 
Official Site

Film organizations in Canada
Non-profit organizations based in Montreal